Stepan Porfyrovych Vytvytskyi or Dr. Stepan Wytwycky (13 March 1884 near Stanislawow — 9 October 1965 in New York City, United States) was a Ukrainian politician, diplomat, and journalist. He was the President of the Ukrainian People's Republic in exile (1954-1965).

Biography
Stepan Vytvytskyi was born on 13 March 1884, in the village of Uhornyky, next to the city of Stanislawow, Kingdom of Galicia and Lodomeria in Austria-Hungary (now Ukraine). He studied at the law faculties of the Lviv and Vienna Universities. During his years as a student, Vytvytskyi was the head of Academic Hromada in Lviv and the organization Sich in Vienna. In 1910, he began his practice as a lawyer in Drohobych. In 1914, he entered the Legion of Ukrainian Sich Riflemen military organization. From 1915-1918, he was a member of the editorial board of the newspaper Dila, and an editor on the Svoboda newspaper, both being based in Lviv.

While being a member of the Ukrainian National-Democratical Party (UNDP) in October 1918, he was elected as a secretary of the Ukrainian National Rada of the West Ukrainian People's Republic (ZUNR). He was a member of the Ukrainian People's Republic (UPR) Tsentralna Rada and the governmental secretary of foreign affairs of the UPR. As a secretary of the Ukrainian National Rada, he was a member of the delegation of the ZUNR at the Worker's Congress of Ukraine in Kyiv, and a delegation member of the act of merging the ZUNR and UPR on January 22, 1919.

Since October 1919, he was the speaker of the diplomatic missions of the Directory of Ukraine in Warsaw. For some time, Vytvytskyi headed the secretary of foreign affairs in the government of ZUNR in exile in Vienna. In 1921−1923, he headed the ZUNR mission in Paris and London, persuading the governments of these countries (France, United Kingdom) to recognize the occupation of the eastern territory of Galicia by Poland, and help with the re-establishment of its independence.

In 1924, he continued his lawyer practice in Drohobych. From 1935−1939, he was elected to the Polish Sejm from the Drohobycz district. With the occupation of Galicia by Bolsheviks in 1939, he left Drohobych and emigrated to the west. In 1945, he was elected as the co-speaker of the Central Ukrainian Emigration Commission in Germany. After the death of Andriy Livytskyi in 1954, Stepan Vytvytskyi was elected as the president of the Ukrainian People's Republic in exile. He died in New York City on October 9, 1965, and was buried at the cemetery of Bound Brook, New Jersey.

External links

 ukrainianpresident.org.ua - Biography of Stepan Vytvytskyi 
 Svoboda. The Ukrainian Weekly. December 2, 1961.

1884 births
1965 deaths
Politicians from Ivano-Frankivsk
People from the Kingdom of Galicia and Lodomeria
Ukrainian Austro-Hungarians
Ukrainian National Democratic Alliance politicians
West Ukrainian People's Republic people
Presidents of the Ukrainian People's Republic
Foreign ministers of Ukraine
Members of the Sejm of the Second Polish Republic (1935–1938)
Members of the Sejm of the Second Polish Republic (1938–1939)
Diplomats from Ivano-Frankivsk
Austro-Hungarian emigrants to the United States
Writers from Ivano-Frankivsk